Thereuopoda clunifera is a species of centipede in the genus Thereuopoda and the family Scutigeridae. It was described by Charles Thorold Wood in 1862. It has been seen visiting Mitrastemon yamamotoi flowers.

References 

clunifera
Taxa named by Charles Thorold Wood
Animals described in 1862